Saint-Pierre-de-Bœuf is a commune in the Loire department in central France.

Population

See also
Communes of the Loire department

References

Saintpierredeboeuf